Moln may refer to:
 Mölln, Schleswig-Holstein, Germany
 Moln, Iran